The Anglican Diocese of Ngbo is one of 12 within the Anglican Province of Enugu, itself one of 14 provinces within the Church of Nigeria. The  bishop emeritus  is Christian Ebisike and the current bishop is Godwin Awoke.

Notes

Church of Nigeria dioceses
Dioceses of the Province of Enugu